Remy Arnod is a French para-alpine skier. He represented France at the 1976 Winter Paralympics, at the 1980 Winter Paralympics and at the 1984 Winter Paralympics.

In total, he won three bronze medals in alpine skiing: two at the 1976 Winter Paralympics and one at the 1980 Winter Paralympics.

Achievements

See also 
 List of Paralympic medalists in alpine skiing

References

External links 
 

Living people
Year of birth missing (living people)
Place of birth missing (living people)
Paralympic alpine skiers of France
Alpine skiers at the 1976 Winter Paralympics
Alpine skiers at the 1980 Winter Paralympics
Alpine skiers at the 1984 Winter Paralympics
Medalists at the 1976 Winter Paralympics
Medalists at the 1980 Winter Paralympics
Paralympic bronze medalists for France
Paralympic medalists in alpine skiing
20th-century French people